Qhunqhu Wankani (Aymara, Hispanicized spellings Khonkho Wankane, Khonkho Wankani, Khonko Huancane, Qhunqhu Wankane) is an archaeological site in Bolivia located in the La Paz Department, Ingavi Province, Jesús de Machaca Municipality. It is situated south of Lake Wiñaymarka, the southern part of Lake Titicaca, and south of Tiwanku, near the village Qhunqhu Liqiliqi.

Further reading
 Landscape and Politics in the Ancient Andes: Biographies of Place at Khonkho Wankane by Scott C. Smith, 2016, University of New Mexico Press

References 

 bolivia.com/ (Spanish) Khonkho Wankane, una civilización anterior a Tiwanaku

Archaeological sites in Bolivia
Buildings and structures in La Paz Department (Bolivia)